The Grévin Seoul is a waxwork museum in Seoul, South Korea. The museum was founded in 2015.

References

External links
 

Museums in Seoul
Wax museums
Buildings and structures in Jung District, Seoul
Museums established in 2015
2015 establishments in South Korea